Buddhiprakash (English: Light of Knowledge) is a Gujarati language magazine published by Gujarat Vidhya Sabha (formerly known as Gujarat Vernacular Society), Ahmedabad, India.

History 

Buddhiprakash was established in 1850 as a lithotype fortnightly. The first issue of the magazine was published on 15 May 1850 from Ahmedabad. It had 16 pages with articles on 26 subjects ranging from science and technology to philosophy. It cost 1.5 Anna to readers per issue then. After one and a half years of publication, it was closed.

Later, in April 1854, with the help of Rao Bahadur Bhogilal Pranvallabhdas and under the guidance of T. B. Curtis, the headmaster of the Ahmedabad English school, it resumed publication. In 1855, on request of Alexander Kinloch Forbes, Dalpatram accepted to serve as the editor of the magazine and edited it until 1879. Later it was edited by Hiralal T. Parekh, Rasiklal Parikh, Umashankar Joshi, K. K. Shastri, Bhogilal Sandesara, Yashvant Shukla, Nagindas Parekh and Hariprasad Shastri. It is now edited by Madhusoodan Parekh and Ramesh Shah.

Content 
Buddhiprakash was the leading magazine in the social reform era of Gujarat in the 19th century, advocating reforms in variety of fields. Apart from literature, it published articles in sociology, politics, religion, philosophy, zoology, botany, archeology, history, geography and economics. It occasionally published special issues. Dalpatram's work Dalpatpingal based on poetic metres was serialized in this magazine from 1855 to 1860.

See also
 List of Gujarati-language magazines

References

1850 establishments in India
Literary magazines published in India
Magazines established in 1850
Gujarati-language magazines
Mass media in Ahmedabad